Melanophila is a genus of buprestid beetles commonly known as fire beetles. They have extraordinary sensitivity to infrared radiation (heat), using a specialized sensor organ near their legs.

Species
The genus Melanophila consists of the following species:

 Melanophila acuminata (DeGeer, 1774)
 Melanophila atra Gory, 1841
 Melanophila atropurpurea (Say, 1823)
 Melanophila caudata (Laporte & Gory, 1837)
 Melanophila consputa LeConte, 1857
 Melanophila cockerellae Wickham, 1912
 Melanophila coriacea Kerremans, 1894
 Melanophila cuspidata (Klug, 1829)
 Melanophila gestroi Obenberger, 1923
 Melanophila handlirschi Wickham, 1912
 Melanophila heeri Wickham, 1914
 Melanophila ignicola Champion, 1918
 Melanophila notata (Laporte & Gory, 1837)
 Melanophila obscurata Lewis, 1893
 Melanophila occidentalis Obenberger, 1928
 Melanophila unicolor Gory, 1841

References

Buprestidae genera